Long Rock Methodist Episcopal Church, South, also known as Long Rock United Methodist Church, is a historic church in rural Carroll County, Tennessee.

The church building was built in 1886 and was listed on the National Register of Historic Places in 2010. In addition to its use as a Methodist church, it has a history of importance to its community as a venue for meetings, community singing, homecomings, and circuit church events. The Tennessee Historical Commission describes it as a "good example" of rural church architecture of the 19th century, with solid brickwork, a gabled façade with a segmental arch entry, and large segmental arched windows with multiple lights.

References

Buildings and structures in Carroll County, Tennessee
Methodist churches in Tennessee
Churches on the National Register of Historic Places in Tennessee
Churches completed in 1886
National Register of Historic Places in Carroll County, Tennessee